Elie Onana Eloundou (13 October 1951 – 2 April 2018) was a Cameroonian professional footballer who played as a midfielder. He competed for the Cameroon national football team at the 1982 FIFA World Cup finals.

References

External links

1951 births
2018 deaths
People from Centre Region (Cameroon)
Cameroonian footballers
Cameroon under-20 international footballers
Cameroon international footballers
1982 African Cup of Nations players
1982 FIFA World Cup players
Olympic footballers of Cameroon
Footballers at the 1984 Summer Olympics
Canon Yaoundé players
Association football midfielders